Phagor may refer to:

Phagor, a biblical city mentioned in the Greek (Septuagint) version of the Book of Joshua
The phagors, a race of fictional creatures in Brian Aldiss' Helliconia trilogy.